WVRT (97.7 FM) is an American radio station licensed to Mill Hall, Pennsylvania with an output power of 6,000 watts. "V97" is owned by iHeartMedia and plays Top 40 (CHR) music.

History

WVRT signed on the air November 6, 1995 at 6:00 a.m. as a Hot AC station broadcasting from the Williamsport Chamber of Commerce building with AM sister station WWPA.  Williamsport Radio Corporation first owned Variety 97.7, and its format was chosen to sound more adult than top 40 HOT-FM 103.9 WHTO but not as old as gold-based AC 102.7 KISS-FM WKSB.  WVRT used to be oldies "3WD 97-7" with the callsign WWWD.

In 1996, WHTO moved down the FM dial to 93.3 with 25,000 watts, an increase from the 6,000 watts it had had at 103.9 FM.  With the increased power came a more watered-down Top 40 (CHR) format, sounding more like the Hot AC Variety 97.7 was playing.  Falling ratings caused HOT-FM to switch to oldies in 1997.

WVRT moved its studio to Third Street in Williamsport with KISS-FM and WRAK-AM & FM.  The "point" was also left at the Chamber of Commerce building as WVRT would now be known as "Variety 97-7" keeping its top 40 format.
Due to corporate changes Variety 97.7 is now branded V97 "Central PA's Hit Music!" It also has adopted a new logo.

WVRT is simulcast on co-owned WVRZ (99.7) in Mount Carmel.

 The first song played on Variety 97.7 was "If I Ever Lose My Faith In You" by Sting.
 WVRT was the first station in Williamsport to utilize digital computer automation.  Often the weekday DJs would record voice tracks for the weekend that sounded live, as if the DJ were in the studio.
 Variety 97.7's original live remote broadcast vehicle was a Volkswagen Vanagon mini-bus, which often had to be "jump started" just like the one in the movie Little Miss Sunshine.
 As an April Fools' Day joke in 1998, John Patrick looped the end of the song "Lovin', Touchin', Squeezin'" by Journey for almost an hour and played it on the air after the 7 a.m. news.  Patrick took calls on the air about his "Compact Disc being stuck."
The original Variety 97.7 on-air line-up was:
John Patrick - Mornings
Jeff Austin - Middays
Mike Stevens - Afternoons
Troy Lee - Evenings
Overnights were board-oped until the computer automation was installed.

Current V-97 on-air lineup
Mornings: Elvis Duran

Mid-days: On-Air with Ryan Seacrest

Afternoons: Marlyn & DC

Evenings: On Air Romeo

Overnights: JoJo Wright

Weekends:  Boy Toy Jesse, Letty B, JoJo Wright, Romeo (Most Requested Live), Tanya Rad & EJ (The Vibe), and Ryan Seacrest (AT40)

External links

VRT
Radio stations established in 1987
IHeartMedia radio stations
Contemporary hit radio stations in the United States